Lebanon, PA  is a 2010 American drama film written and directed by Ben Hickernell. The film tells the story of Will, a 35-year-old  Philadelphian who travels to nearby Lebanon, Pennsylvania, to bury his recently deceased father. While visiting he connects with his 17-year-old cousin, CJ, who is recently pregnant. Will then meets and becomes romantically interested in CJ's teacher, who is married. After CJ has an argument with her father, she and Will face difficult decisions regarding their futures. The film explores the challenges of bridging the cultural divide in the United States through the lens of an extended family.

Matt Pond and Chris Hansen of the band Matt Pond PA composed the score for the film.

The film premiered at the 2010 South by Southwest Film Festival, and had a limited release in the United States on April 29, 2011. , the film holds a 50% approval rating on Rotten Tomatoes, based on 16 reviews with average rating of 6.03/10.

References

External links 
 
 Lebanon, PA - website

2010 films
2010s drama road movies
American drama road movies
American pregnancy films
2010s English-language films
2010s American films